Jean Bourlès (17 August 1930 – 30 March 2021) was a French professional road bicycle racer. He was born in Pleyber-Christ. He was a professional cyclist between 1954 and 1965. He won stage 16 in the 1957 Tour de France.

Major results

1955
Callac
1956
Etoile du Léon
1957
Callac
Ploudalmezeau
Tour de France:
Winner stage 16
1958
Callac
Circuit des genêts verts
Coatserho
Gouesnou
Guimillau
Huelgoat
Loqueffret
Maël-Pestivien
Plougastic
Pont-de-Croix
Saint-Pol-de-Leon
1959
Plougastel
1960
Puteaux
Saint-Eutrope
Plessala, Plessala
1961
Camors
1962
Bothsorel
Camors
Plounevez-Quintin
1963
Mi-Août Bretonne
Plougonver
Plougasnou
Pleine-Fougères
1964
Circuit des genêts verts (with Joseph Thomin)
GP Ouest-France
Huelgoat
Saint-Lormel
1965
Le Faouet
Miniac-Morvan
Quemper-Guézennec
1966
Pleyber-Christ
Présenaye
Tréguier
1967
Plélan-le-Petit
Plemet
Plouëc-du-Trieux
Plouigneau
Saint-Caradec
1968
Plourach

References

External links 

Official Tour de France results for Jean Bourlès

French male cyclists
1930 births
French Tour de France stage winners
2021 deaths
Sportspeople from Finistère
Cyclists from Brittany